Bustos Media L.L.C. is a media corporation headquartered in Portland, Oregon.

Bustos Media specializes in operating Spanish-language, and other ethnic, radio stations in the United States. Most of its stations broadcast in Spanish; however, two of the company's stations have the Portland, Oregon, market's only full-time Russian language formats (KOOR and KXET).

History
The company, originally headquartered in Sacramento, California, was founded in July 2003 by Amador Bustos and his brother John Bustos, with investments from Providence Equity Partners, Providence, R.I., Alta Communications, Boston, and Opportunity Capital, Fremont, California. The Sacramento-based Bustos Media, a private broadcasting company specializing in Spanish language radio, has over $100 million in private equity. "Amador Bustos has built two radio empires catering to the tastes of America's Spanish-speaking population."  Station is currently owned by ADELANTE MEDIA OF CALIFORNIA LICENSE LLC

In 1992, the Amador brothers, with $3 million in private equity investment from Syndicated Communications (SYNCOM), launched Z-Spanish Radio Network, Inc. Over a period of eight years they acquired 32 radio stations. In 2000, Z-Spanish sold the chain to Entravision Communications at a total valuation of $475 million.

In May 2006, Bustos Media gained approval from the Federal Communications Commission to launch a Spanish-language television station in Milwaukee with programming from Azteca América. As of 2009, Bustos Media had 25 radio stations across the U.S. and several television stations.

In January 2010 Bustos Media revealed that it was in technical default with its lenders.  On June 30, 2010, Bustos Media announced that the stations would be transferred to NAP Broadcast Holdings LLC, a company named for and controlled by its senior lenders, pending FCC approval. As part of the agreement, Amador and John Bustos resigned, effective immediately.

In September 2010 NAP Broadcasting closed on the merger and announced that they would proceed under the name "Adelante Media Group".

The Bustoses were able to keep some stations in Oregon, California and Texas. In 2011, Bustos Media repurchased the Adelante stations in Portland. Bustos reacquired several radio stations in Washington from Adelante Media Group for $6 million in 2014; the following year, the company bought back WDDW in Milwaukee from Adelante for $1 million.

Stations

Arizona
 KZLZ 105.3 FM, Casas Adobes Regional Mexican
  K223CI 92.5,  Reggaeton (Simulcast 105.3 HD-2 KZLZ) 
 KTGV 106.3 FM, Tucson  Rhythmic Oldies
 KVOI 1030 AM, Cortaro  News/Talk

California
 KHHZ 97.7, Gridley, California Regional Mexican
 KZSZ 107.5, Colusa, California Regional Mexican

Oregon
 KCKX 1460 AM, Dayton Regional Mexican (Simulcast 940 KWBY)
 KGDD 1150 AM, Portland Regional Mexican
 K228EU 93.5 FM, Portland Regional Mexican (Simulcast 1150 KGDD)
 KOOR 1010 AM,  Milwaukie Russian Christian
 KXET 1520 AM, Oregon City Russian Christian
 KSND 95.1 FM, Mommouth Regional Mexican
 KWBY 940 AM, Woodburn Regional Mexican
 K227DU 93.3, Salem Regional Mexican (Simulcast 940 KWBY)
 KQRR 1130 AM, Mt Angel Russian Christian
 KZGD 1390 AM, Salem Regional Mexican
 KZTB 97.9 FM, Milton-Freewater, Oregon  Regional Mexican

Washington
 KDDS-FM 99.3 FM, Elma Regional Mexican
 KDYM 1230 AM, Sunnyside Spanish Adult Hits
 KMIA 1210 AM, Auburn Regional Mexican
 KMMG 96.7 FM, Benton City Spanish CHR
 KMNA 98.7 FM, Mabton
 KRCW 96.3 FM, Royal City Regional Mexican
 KYXE 104.9 FM, Union Gap Regional Mexican
 KZML 95.9 FM, Quincy Regional Mexican
 K225AR 92.9 FM, Wenatchee (rebroadcasts KZML)
 KZNW 103.3 FM, Mt. Vernon Regional Mexican
 KZTA 96.9 FM, Naches Regional Mexican
 KZTM 102.9 FM, McKenna Regional Mexican
 KZUS 92.3 FM, Ephrata Regional Mexican
 KZXR-FM 101.7 FM, Prosser

Wisconsin
 WDDW 104.7 FM, Sturtevant Regional Mexican

Former Bustos Media stations

California
 KTTA 94.3 FM, Jackson Regional Mexican sold to Radio Lazer
 KLMG 97.9 FM, Esparto Spanish CHR sold to Radio Lazer
 KBBU 93.9 FM, Modesto Regional Mexican sold to Radio Lazer
 KBAA 103.3 FM, Grass Valley Regional Mexican sold to Radio Lazer
 Azteca América 32 KSTV-LP, Sacramento sold to Radio Lazer

Colorado
 KKHI 101.9, Denver

Idaho
 KDBI 101.9 FM, Emmett Regional Mexican
 KDBI 106.3 FM, Homedale Spanish CHR

Oregon
 KRYN 1230 AM, Gresham Spanish Christian sold to Centro Familiar Cristiano

Texas
 KTXV 890 AM, Mabank

Utah
 KDUT 102.3 FM, Randolph
 KTUB 1600 AM, Centreville
 KBMG 106.1 FM, Evanston, Wyoming
 KBTU-LP TV, Salt Lake City

Washington
 KDYK 1020 AM, Union Gap Spanish Adult Hits sold to Centro Familiar Cristiano
 K229AD 93.7 FM, Yakima (rebroadcasts KDYK) sold to Centro Familiar Cristiano
 KULE 730 AM, Ephrata Spanish sold to Centro Familiar Cristiano
 KZXR 1310 AM, Prosser, sold to Iglesia Pentecostal Vispera del Fin
 K237GY 95.3 FM, Prosser (rebroadcasts KZXR) sold to Iglesia Pentecostal Vispera del Fin

Wisconsin
 MundoFox 38 WBWT-LP, Milwaukee

Z-Spanish Radio Network
Z-Spanish Radio Network had the following radio stations at the time of its sale to Entravision in August 2000.

Arizona
 KZLZ
 KVVA
 KZNO

California
 KZSA-FM
 KZMS-FM
 KZWC-FM
 KZSF-FM
 KHOT
 KZFO-FM
 KZCO
 KZSF
 KSQR
 KQBR
 KTDO-FM
 KLOC
 KZMS-FM

Illinois
 WZCH-FM
 WRZA-FM
 WYPA-AM

Indiana
 WNDZ

Massachusetts
 WBPS

Texas
 KZDL-FM
 KZDF
 KRVA
 KZMP

See also

 Redwood City, California
 List of radio stations in California
 List of United States radio markets
 List of radio stations in Oregon
 List of Salt Lake City media
 List of radio stations in Washington

References

External links
 

Broadcasting companies of the United States
Radio broadcasting companies of the United States
Companies based in Portland, Oregon
Mass media in Portland, Oregon